Sergey Kayumovich Shakurov (born 1 January 1942) is a Soviet and Russian actor of theater. He has appeared in more than ninety films since 1967.

Life and career 
Sergey Shakurov was born in Russian-Tatar family of Moscow. In 1964, after graduating from the school-studio, actor started working at the Theatre on Malaya Bronnaya, and a year later he was accepted into the troupe of the Central Academic Theatre of the Soviet Army. Out of the theater together with  Leonid Kheyfetz in the Maly Theatre after the close of the play "Two Friends" by Vladimir Voinovich, but it was not adopted. Since 1971, Sergey Shakurov worked in the Stanislavsky Drama Theatre. Now the actor Moscow Youth Theatre.

In the movie Sergey Shakurov made his debut in 1966, appearing soon in the lead role in the movie Manos Zacharias, "I'm a Soldier Mom". He played Peganov,  stubborn and difficult to discipline the rookie faced by an experienced foreman (Valentin Zubkov).

Selected filmography
Sergey Shakurov has starred in over 114 films.

References

External links

1942 births
Living people
Male actors from Moscow
Soviet male film actors
Soviet male television actors
Soviet male stage actors
Russian male film actors
Russian male television actors
Russian male stage actors
Volga Tatar people
People's Artists of the RSFSR
Recipients of the USSR State Prize
Recipients of the Order of Honour (Russia)
Academicians of the Russian Academy of Cinema Arts and Sciences "Nika"
Academicians of the National Academy of Motion Picture Arts and Sciences of Russia